May Wallace (August 23, 1877 – December 11, 1938) was an American film actress.

Biography

Wallace was born in 1877 in Russiaville, Indiana. As a film actress, she often played supporting roles for producer Hal Roach in his Laurel and Hardy and Our Gang comedies, mostly in maternal roles. She appeared in more than 60 films between 1914 and 1939.

Wallace was married to Thomas W. Maddox until her death, they had one daughter and one son. She died in Los Angeles, California, of heart disease, aged 61.

Selected filmography

 My Lady Friends (1921)
 The Cup of Life (1921)
 Gimme (1923) as Mrs. Cecily McGimsey
 Dollar Devils (1923)
 The Reckless Age (1924)
 Oh, You Tony! (1924)
 Now I'll Tell One (1927)
 Sailors, Beware! (1927)
 Love 'em and Weep (1927)
 Crazy House (1928)
 Painted Faces (1929)
 Love Business (1931)
 County Hospital (1932)
 Readin' and Writin' (1932)
 Free Eats (1932)
 The Pooch (1932)
 The Kid from Borneo (1933)
 Twice Two (Voice) (1933)
 What's Your Racket? (1934)
 Beginner's Luck (1935)
 Arbor Day (1936)
 Roamin' Holiday (1937)
 Way Out West (1937)

References

External links

1877 births
1938 deaths
Actresses from Indiana
American film actresses
American silent film actresses
20th-century American actresses
Our Gang